Jochen Müller (born 18 April 1963, in Erbach) is a German former footballer who played as a defender. Müller began his career with hometown club Erbach before moving to Mannheim in 1986. Müller spent five seasons with the club before moving to Scottish side Dundee United in 1991. Müller managed five appearances before injury forced him into early retirement.

In July 2007, Müller returned to Mannheim as a youth coach on a three-year contract.

References

Living people
1963 births
German footballers
SV Waldhof Mannheim players
Dundee United F.C. players
Bundesliga players
2. Bundesliga players
Scottish Football League players
Association football defenders